Farmyard pox is a group of closely related Parapoxviruses of sheep and cattle that can cause bovine papular stomatitis, orf and milker's nodule in humans.

See also 
 Skin lesion

References 

Virus-related cutaneous conditions